Frigate Bird or variation, may refer to:

 Frigatebird (Fregatidae family): frigate bird seabirds
 Frigate Bird (6 May 1962) a nuclear bomb explosion test, part of Operation Dominic
 , a U.S. Navy ship name

See also

 
 
 Frigate (disambiguation)
 Bird (disambiguation)